Kate Sylvester is a New Zealand fashion designer known for combining sportswear, lingerie and traditional tailoring. Her designs are often influenced by books or art, and the fashion of the 1930s and 1950s.

"Books are a big thing. When I read them, I like to dress the characters. And then I realise that there's a collection in that," she told New Zealand journalist Sarah Catherall. Titles for her collections have included Catcher in the Rye, Love in a Cold Climate, Brighton Rock and This Charming Man, which was inspired by Marcel Proust. Her eyewear collections have included spectacles named Sylvia (Plath), Harper (Lee), Janet (Frame) and Eleanor (Catton). Sylvester's collection Art Groupie referenced the Surrealists, and The Kiss a painting by Gustav Klimt.

Sylvester grew up on Auckland's North Shore in the 1970s, and attended Westlake Girls High School. Her father, Ron, was a teacher, while her mother, Toni, showed her how to sew. Sylvester studied textile and clothing design at Wellington Polytechnic (the former Massey University) from 1985 to 1986. She then went to London, where she worked for Arabella Pollen in London, and Corinne Robson in Paris. On her return to New Zealand, she launched her first label, Sister, in 1993.

She changed the name of the label to Kate Sylvester in 1997, after her foray into Australian shops met resistance from the Australian label Sista.

Kate Sylvester owns the diffusion lines Sylvester, Kate Sylvester eyewear, accessories, lingerie, and homeware produced with the Auckland design studio Douglas + Bec.

Metro Magazine named her one of New Zealand's top five designers, and her biography is included in the book New Zealand Fashion Design by Angela Lassig.

Personal life 
Kate Sylvester has three sons and is married to the designer Wayne Conway. She lives in Auckland, New Zealand.

Awards 

 2008: Inducted into the Massey University College of Creative Arts Hall of Fame in 2008.
2008: The Emerging Small-to-Medium Business award at the 2008 NZI National Sustainable Business Awards.

References 

New Zealand fashion designers
New Zealand women fashion designers
Living people
Year of birth missing (living people)
People educated at Westlake Girls High School